Enzo Siciliano (27 May 1934 – 9 June 2006) was an Italian writer, playwright, literary critic and intellectual.

Siciliano was born in Rome. He was collaborator of Alberto Moravia, Pier Paolo Pasolini, Elsa Morante and many other famous writers in the 1950s and 1960s. 

From 1996 to 1998 he was President of RAI (Italian State Television). He died in Rome in 2006, aged 72, from complications of diabetes.

Selected bibliography

Novels
La principessa e l’antiquario (1980)
Carta blu (1992)
I bei momenti (1997, premio Strega)
Non entrare nel campo degli orfani (2002)

Theatre
La casa scoppiata (1986)
La vittima (1987)

Criticism
Prima della poesia (1965)
Autobiografia letteraria (1970)
Vita di Pasolini (1978)
Letteratura italiana ("Italian Literature", 3 vol., 1986–88)

Filmography

External links
"Italian author, broadcaster Enzo Siciliano dies"
Obituary by John Francis Lane, The Guardian, 28 June 2006

1934 births
2006 deaths
20th-century Italian novelists
20th-century Italian male writers
21st-century Italian novelists
20th-century Italian dramatists and playwrights
Deaths from diabetes
Italian dramatists and playwrights
Italian literary critics
Italian male novelists
Italian male dramatists and playwrights
Strega Prize winners
Viareggio Prize winners
Writers from Rome
21st-century Italian male writers
Italian male non-fiction writers